Tekoa Mountain is a  summit  north of Tekoa, just south of the Spokane County–Whitman County line in the U.S. state of Washington. It is the highest point in Whitman County. The peak is used as a launch site by hang gliding enthusiasts except when it is closed for fire danger.

References

External links
 

Landforms of Whitman County, Washington
Mountains of Washington (state)